Neoptolemus I of Epirus (370–357 BC) was a Greek king of Epirus and son of Alcetas I, and father of Troas, Alexander I of Epirus and Queen Olympias. He was the maternal grandfather of Alexander the Great. He claimed he was a descendant of hero Achilles and King Lycomedes, while Emperor Caracalla claimed that he was a descendant of Neoptolemus I. Olympias was originally known as Polyxena and it is possible that Neoptolemus gave her that name.

Etymology

His name means "new war". This was also a name of the son of the warrior Achilles and the Princess Deidamia in Greek mythology, and also the mythical progenitor of the ruling dynasty of the Molossians of ancient Epirus.

Reign
On the death of Alcetas, Neoptolemus and his brother Arybbas agreed to divide the kingdom, and continued to rule their respective portions without any interruption of the harmony between them, until the death of Neoptolemus, which, according to German historian Johann Gustav Droysen, may be placed about 360 BC. The first epigraphical evidence of the Molossian League goes back to 370 BC under Neoptolemus.

See also
List of the kings of Ancient Epirus

Notes

References
Pausanias i. 11. §§ 1, 3
Justin vii. 6. § 10, xvii. 3. § 14
Droysen, Hellenismus, vol. i. p. 250

Rulers of Ancient Epirus
4th-century BC Greek people
4th-century BC rulers
Year of birth unknown
350s BC deaths